The Pra della Valle in Padua is a 1741-1746 oil on canvas painting of the Prato della Valle in Padua by Canaletto. It entered the collection of the Milanese nobleman Gian Giacomo Poldi Pezzoli and from there it passed its present owner, the Museo Poldi Pezzoli in Milan.

History
The first written description of the work was by Emmanuele Antonio Cicogna, who mentioned it as part of Giuseppe Pasquali's collection in Venice. He also stated it "had been engraved in copperplate by the same artist, but with variations between the painting and the print". The Royal Library at Windsor Castle houses an etching of the same subject is one of 31 works after Canaletto in the collection of Joseph Smith, British resident in Venice, and two preparatory drawings for the paintings. Other versions also attributed to Canaletto survive in private collections and another attributed to his pupil Francesco Guardi is now in the Musée des Beaux-Arts de Dijon.

The work was initially attributed to Bernardo Bellotto by the Museo Poldi Pezzoli's first Giuseppe Bertini in his 1881 catalogue of the collection, but modern art historians consider it to be similar enough to Canaletto's 1740s works to make a secure attribution to him.

References 

Paintings by Canaletto
Paintings in the collection of the Museo Poldi Pezzoli
Cityscape paintings
1746 paintings